Doto furva is a species of sea slug, a nudibranch, a marine gastropod mollusc in the family Dotidae.

Distribution
This species is known from Tarifa and Ceuta, on both sides of the Strait of Gibraltar, at the entrance to the Mediterranean Sea.

Description
The body of this nudibranch is mostly translucent white in colour, with yellow ovotestis showing through the middle of the body in mature animals. The ceratal tubercles are capped with black, giving a very characteristic appearance.

EcologyDoto furva feeds on the hydroid Sertularella cylindritheca'', family Sertulariidae.

References

Dotidae
Gastropods described in 1984